Somnific Flux is a collaborative album by Mick Harris and Bill Laswell, released on March 7, 1995 by Subharmonic.

Track listing

Personnel 
Adapted from the Somnific Flux liner notes.

Musicians
Mick Harris – effects, recording, photography
Bill Laswell – effects, recording, mixing

Technical
Layng Martine – assistant engineer
Robert Musso – engineering

Release history

References

External links 
 
 Somnific Flux at Bandcamp

1995 albums
Collaborative albums
Bill Laswell albums
Albums produced by Mick Harris
Albums produced by Bill Laswell
Subharmonic (record label) albums